Cliff Sings is the second album by British Cliff Richard and his first studio album. It was released in November 1959 through EMI Columbia Records and recorded at Abbey Road Studios. It reached No. 2 in the UK album chart. No singles were released from the album in the UK (as was often the case prior to the 1970s).

The album is the beginning of a repeated pattern in Richard's career until the mid-1960s, in which the Shadows and the Norrie Paramor orchestra would alternately share backing duties. The back cover of the album states that it was at the suggestion of the album's recording engineer, Malcolm Addy, that influenced Norrie Paramor to alternate Richard's backing between the Shadows and the string orchestra for this album. Tony Meehan from the Shadows was the session drummer for all tracks backed by the orchestra on this album.

While backing duties were shared equally on this album, Richard's next album, Me and My Shadows, would be backed entirely by the Shadows, while its successor, Listen to Cliff!, would have the Norrie Paramor orchestra on backing duties for all but one track.

Cliff Sings was recorded in both stereo and mono but originally only released in mono on LP. From February 1960, the album was also progressively marketed on the EP format, into four EPs, Cliff Sings No.1 through to Cliff Sings No.4, in both mono and stereo.

Track listing

Release formats
Vinyl LP mono
Reel to Reel Tape.(?)
CD mono
CD mono/stereo

Personnel
Cliff Richard and the Shadows
Cliff Richard – lead vocals
Hank Marvin – lead guitar
Bruce Welch - rhythm guitar
Jet Harris – bass guitar
Tony Meehan – drums

Production
Produced by Norrie Paramor
Engineered by Malcolm Addey

References

Cliff Richard albums
The Shadows albums
1959 albums
EMI Columbia Records albums
Albums produced by Norrie Paramor
British rock-and-roll albums